Babis Psimogiannos (born 13 August 1947) is a Greek former professional footballer who played as striker.

Club career
Psimogiannos started his football career at his club of his village, Aris Agios Konstantinos, where his brother Antonis also played. With Psimogiannos as a key and irreplaceable member of the offensive line, the team of Aris Agios Konstantinos achieved promotion to the second division in 1970 season after three play-off mathes against Paniliakos. The achievement was surprising by the standards of the time, as it was unprecedented for the team of a large village of 2,000 inhabitants to compete in a national division. Psimogiannos played with Aris Agios Konstantinos in the second division and at the end of the season the team was relegated in 1971, unable to withstand the intense competition of the division, and Psimogiannos having aroused the interest of the big clubs with his performances, he transferred to AEK Athens, the team he supported as a child. It was characteristic that the fans of AEK from Agios Konstantinos organized trips every other Sunday to Nea Filadelfeia to see their big star and fellow countryman, playing for the yellow-blacks. The movement of Psimogiannos to the club was also the cause of the establishment of the club of AEK Agios Konstantinos by refugees of AEK at the area in the early 80's. A dynamic centrer-forward with great physicality, Psimogiannos found a place in the club's squad, being in many matches the strong and solid player of the offense, that broke the opposing defenses.

He managed to play with AEK in the UEFA competitions making 4 appearances. as he played the full 90 minutes in the 3–2 home win over Internazionale on 29 September 1972 for the European Cup and as a substitute in both legs against Salgótarján on September 1972 and in the 1–3 home defeat by Liverpool on 7 November 1972 for the UEFA Cup. In the summer of 1974, the president of the club, Loukas Barlos negotiating the acquisition of the legendary striker of Panionios, Georgios Dedes, alongside Giorgos Skrekis and Victor Theofilopoulos was asked for Psimogiannos among the exchangers to cover the attacking gap of Dedes. Psimogiannos accepted the move obeying the wishes of Barlos and left everyone surprised when in a television interview with journalist Kostas Kyriazis, as the new transfer acquisition of Panionios, stated that he accepted only because it was dictated by the interest of his beloved AEK. He played for Panionios for two seasons, before the arrival of Nikos Anastopoulos from Dafni in the summer of 1976, which led Psimogiannos to move to Apollon Athens, where he played for three seasons. In the summer of 1979, he returned to Aris Agios Konstantinou, where he played until the end of his football career in 1984.

Honours

Aris Agios Konstantinos
Phthiotis AFC League: 1968, 1969, 1970

References

1947 births
Living people
Greek footballers
Super League Greece players
AEK Athens F.C. players
Panionios F.C. players
Apollon Smyrnis F.C. players
Association football forwards
People from Phthiotis